Marcel Louis Vonk (born 14 January 1974) is a poker player and the first Dutch person to win a World Series of Poker (WSOP) bracelet in No Limit Hold'em (NLHE).  On 5 July 2010, he beat out 3,843 opponents to capture the gold bracelet in event #54: $1,000 No-Limit Hold'em, taking home $570,960 USD for the victory.

In 2008, Rob Hollink became the first Dutch WSOP bracelet winner by winning the $10,000 WSOP Limit Hold'em World Championship event.  In 2009, Marc Naalden won the second WSOP gold bracelet for the Netherlands by winning the $2,000 WSOP Limit Hold'em event.

Personal life 
Marcel Vonk has a Ph.D. in physics from University of Amsterdam, and works as a researcher in string theory at the University of Amsterdam. In 2010 he authored a book on string theory in Dutch.

World Series of Poker bracelets

References

1974 births
Living people
21st-century Dutch physicists
Dutch poker players
World Series of Poker bracelet winners
University of Amsterdam alumni
People from Leiderdorp
Academic staff of the University of Amsterdam